Jan Heemskerk Abrahamszoon (30 July 1818 – 9 October 1897) was a Dutch politician who served as Chairman of the Council of Ministers from 1874 to 1877, and again from 1883 to 1888. His son, Theo Heemskerk also served as Chairman of the Council of Ministers.

Biography

Jan Heemskerk Abrahamszoon was born on 30 July 1818 in Amsterdam. He was the son of Abraham Heemskerk and Joanna Jacoba Stuart. He was baptized on August 27, 1818, in the Remonstrant Church in Amsterdam.

He studied law and became a lawyer, then a member of the House of Representatives. Originally a liberal politician, he became a conservative in 1866, and remained this in his Premiership.

He was three times Ministers of the Interior (1866–1868; 1874–1877; 1883–1888) and three times temporary chairman of the Council of Ministers, similar to the present-day Prime Minister, (1867–1868; 1874–1877; 1883–1888). He was Minister of State from 1885 to his death.

Heemskerk died on 9 October 1897, at the age of 79, in The Hague.

Personal life 
Heemskerk married his first cousin Anna Maria Heemskerk on 1 October 1846 in Utrecht. They had 5 sons, one of whom died in infancy, and 3 daughters. His son Theo Heemskerk (1852–1932) was Chairman of the Council of Ministers from 1908 to 1913.<ref> Mr. Th. (Theo) Heemskerk, Parlement & Politiek. Retrieved on 7 March 2015.</ref> His son Jan Frederik Heemskerk (1867–1944) was a member of the House of Representatives.

Published works
Heemskerk's published works includeDe praktijk onzer grondwet. 2 vols. (Utrecht: J. L. Beijers, 1881.)Speciminis inauguralis de Montesquivio pars prior [-altera].'' 2 vols. (Amstelodami: J.H. et G. van Heteren, 1839.)

References

External links 
 

1818 births
1897 deaths
Dutch jurists
Members of the House of Representatives (Netherlands)
Ministers of the Interior of the Netherlands
Ministers of Justice of the Netherlands
Ministers of State (Netherlands)
Municipal councillors of Amsterdam
Prime Ministers of the Netherlands
Remonstrants
University of Amsterdam alumni
Utrecht University alumni